Illinois Route 64 (IL 64, Illinois 64) is an east–west state highway in Northern Illinois. Its western terminus is at the Iowa state line, connecting with U.S. Route 52 (US 52) and Iowa Highway 64  via the Dale Gardner Veterans Memorial Bridge at the Mississippi River west of Savanna. IL 64 then travels east through Mount Carroll, Lanark, Mount Morris, Oregon, Sycamore, Lily Lake, Saint Charles and the western suburbs of Chicago before terminating at U.S. Route 41 (US 41, Lake Shore Drive) on the city's north side.

Route description

IL 64 overlaps US 52 between the Iowa state line and Brookville—a distance of over —so that the IL 64 designation can continue to the Iowa border. East of the Mississippi River, IL 64 is largely a rural, undivided surface road from Savanna to the Fox River in Saint Charles.

At St. Charles, IL 64 enters the Chicago metro area and becomes a four-lane road, taking on the name of Main Street. Just east of St. Charles, IL 64 becomes North Avenue and retains this designation until just before its terminus in Chicago at US 41 (Lake Shore Drive). At IL 59, the road widens further from four to six lanes and becomes a divided highway until its intersection with IL 83 in Elmhurst. From Elmhurst to Interstate 294 (I-294) it remains a four-lane surface street, but it widens to a six-lane divided highway once again through the towns of Stone Park and Northlake. At the Des Plaines River and IL 43, North Avenue becomes four lanes until it reaches North Western Avenue. At this point, it becomes at times a two-lane road, for the rest of its route through Chicago. One-half mile (0.8 km) west of US 41, IL 64 turns north onto LaSalle Boulevard, and then east, before terminating at Lake Shore Drive.

North Avenue is a main east–west artery in Chicago itself, and one of only seven state routes to enter the city. It is located at the 1600 North parallel of Chicago. Just east of the Kennedy Expressway (I-90/I-94), the North Avenue Bridge carries IL 64 over the North Branch of the Chicago River. The hybrid suspension/cable-stayed bridge was built in 2006, replacing a bascule bridge dating back to 1907.

Between Halsted Street and Sheffield Avenue, North Avenue has become a shopping destination, known as the Clybourn Corridor.

History 

State Bond Initiative Route 64 was IL 64 from Sycamore to Chicago. The portion of the road in DuPage County was put through in 1928, the first  highway through the county. In 1937, the road was extended west from Sycamore to what was then US 51 (and is now IL 251). Afterwards, it was extended further west to US 52, and then following it to the state line. Much like IL 92, there is no particular reason for extending IL 64 through Iowa and Nebraska, as existing U.S. Routes served any major cities on the State Route 64s better.

Major junctions

Truck route 

IL 64 has one alternate route; Illinois Route 64 Truck (IL 64 Truck), a bypass around a truck-prohibited, residential section of Elmhurst. Eastbound truck traffic is rerouted north along IL 83, east along US 20 (Lake Street) and then onto I-290 before being allowed to return to IL 64. Westbound truck traffic follows the same route in reverse.

As early as 1989, the City of Elmhurst had sought to block trucks from traveling on North Avenue through its city limits. For a time, Illinois House of Representatives minority leader Lee Daniels supported a plan to reduce North Avenue from four lanes to two, prohibiting trucks from traveling through the residential neighborhood. By 1994, the village had agreed to reconstruct North Avenue and add a single set of left-turn lanes at Myrtle Avenue. Reconstruction of North Avenue in Elmhurst took place in 1997.

References

External links

 Illinois Highway Ends: Illinois Route 64

064
Transportation in Carroll County, Illinois
Transportation in Ogle County, Illinois
Transportation in DeKalb County, Illinois
Transportation in Kane County, Illinois
Transportation in DuPage County, Illinois
Transportation in Cook County, Illinois